Space Cowboys is a 2000 American adventure drama film directed and produced by Clint Eastwood. It stars Eastwood, Tommy Lee Jones, Donald Sutherland, and James Garner as four older "ex-test pilots" who are sent into space to repair an old Soviet satellite.

Plot
In 1958, two U.S. Air Force pilots and aspiring astronauts William "Hawk" Hawkins and Frank Corvin are testing a modified Bell X-2 when Hawk decides to break a height record.  The plane stalls and they are forced to eject, narrowly missing a Boeing B-50 Superfortress flying with navigator "Tank" Sullivan. On the ground, Frank punches Hawk, but their fight is broken up by flight engineer Jerry O'Neill. Their boss, Bob Gerson chastises Hawk before taking them to a press conference, where he announces that the newly created NASA, rather than the USAF, will be conducting space flight tests.

In the present day, NASA is tasked to prevent a Soviet communications satellite, IKON, from decaying out of orbit and crashing to Earth. The satellite's archaic electronics are based on those of Skylab that Frank had developed. Bob, now a project manager at NASA, requests Frank's help. Frank still despises Bob, but agrees provided he has the help of "Team Daedalus" including Hawk, Tank, and Jerry. Bob plans to have younger astronauts shadow the four, so as to replace them before launch. When the press learn of Frank's team, the Vice President convinces Bob that they must be part of the mission for publicity. The old and young teams soon work together, with the older astronauts showing off skills learned without the aid of a computer.

The Space Shuttle Daedalus finds the satellite. It is not a communication satellite but in fact houses six nuclear missiles, relics from the Cold War and a violation of the Outer Space Treaty. Frank discovers that the satellite control system was stolen from Bob's files by the KGB, and that the satellite's computers will launch the missiles at predetermined targets if it falls out of orbit. NASA and the crew plan to use the payload-assist rockets to push the satellite into deep space. However, one of the younger astronauts, Ethan Glance, acting under Bob's original orders, tries to put the satellite into stable orbit himself. He sets off a chain reaction: the satellite collides with the shuttle, damaging most of the shuttle's computer systems and engines, destroying the solar panels on the satellite, and sending it into a faster decaying orbit, while Ethan is knocked out and dragged along with the satellite.

While Tank and Jerry tend to the other young astronaut Roger Hines, who suffered a concussion on the impact, Frank and Hawk space walk to the satellite in time to activate a booster rocket and slow the orbit's decay. As they see to Ethan, they realize that the only option is to have someone ride on the satellite as they fire the missiles' engines so that it escapes into deep space. Hawk, who was recently widowed and who has eight months to live from pancreatic cancer, sacrifices himself, hoping that he will be able to land on the Moon to fulfill his life's dream.

Frank, Tank, and Jerry now plan to bring the shuttle down over water since landing it would be difficult, but the shuttle comes in too fast. After safely bailing out Ethan and Roger, Tank and Jerry stay with Frank regardless of the risk. Frank recalls a maneuver Hawk had used before, purposely increasing the shuttle's angle of attack in the flare to bring the aircraft near a stall, thus allowing the shuttle to drop its speed quickly and allowing him to land the shuttle safely.

The film ends with the Frank Sinatra song "Fly Me to the Moon", zooming in on the surface of the Moon showing that Hawk had indeed landed there before he died.

Cast
 Clint Eastwood as Colonel Francis D. "Frank" Corvin, Ph.D., USAF (Ret.)
 Toby Stephens as Young Frank Corvin
 Tommy Lee Jones as Colonel William "Hawk" Hawkins, USAF (Ret.)
 Eli Craig as Young William "Hawk" Hawkins
 Donald Sutherland as Captain Jerry O'Neill, USAF (Ret.)
 John Mallory Asher as Young Jerry O'Neill
 James Garner as Captain / Reverend "Tank" Sullivan, USAF (Ret.)
 Matt McColm as Young "Tank" Sullivan
 Marcia Gay Harden as Sara Holland
 William Devane as Flight Director Eugene "Gene" Davis
 Loren Dean as Ethan Glance
 Courtney B. Vance as Roger Hines
 James Cromwell as Bob Gerson
 Billie Worley as Young Bob Gerson
 Rade Šerbedžija as General Vostov
 Barbara Babcock as Barbara Corvin
 Blair Brown as Dr. Anne Caruthers
 Jay Leno as Himself
 Jon Hamm as Young pilot
 Chris Wylde as Jason, The Birthday Boy
 Anne Stedman as Girlfriend

Production
Principal photography started in July 1999 and lasted three months. Scenes were filmed on location at the Johnson Space Center in Houston, Texas, and the Kennedy Space Center and Cape Canaveral Air Force Station in Florida. Interior shots of the flight simulator, shuttle, and mission control were filmed on sets at Warner Bros.

The 1958 portrayals of the characters are filmed with younger actors dubbed by their older counterparts.

The original music score was composed by longtime Eastwood collaborator Lennie Niehaus.

Release

The film grossed over $90 million in its United States release, and a further $38 million internationally, for a worldwide total of $128.8 million.

Reception
Space Cowboys was well received by critics. Rotten Tomatoes reports a critic score of 78% based on 122 reviews, with an average rating of 6.72/10. The website's consensus reads, "While the plot is overly clichéd, the superb acting by the stars (especially the tense interactions between Clint Eastwood and Tommy Lee Jones) and the spectacular special effects make this a movie worth seeing." On Metacritic, the film has a weighted average score of 73 out of 100, based on 35 critics, indicating "generally favorable reviews".

Roger Ebert of the Chicago Sun-Times gave it three out of four stars and wrote: "it's too secure within its traditional story structure to make much seem at risk — but with the structure come the traditional pleasures as well."

Accolades
The film was nominated for the Academy Award for Best Sound Editing in 2001.

References

Bibliography

External links
 
 
 
 

2000 films
2000s buddy drama films
2000s disaster films
2000 science fiction films
American buddy action films
American disaster films
American science fiction films
American space adventure films
Cold War films
Films about astronauts
Films about old age
Films directed by Clint Eastwood
Films produced by Clint Eastwood
Films set in Florida
Films set in Houston
Films set in Texas
Films set in Utah
Malpaso Productions films
Village Roadshow Pictures films
Films scored by Lennie Niehaus
Warner Bros. films
Films about NASA
Films about nuclear war and weapons
2000s English-language films
2000s American films